Srinath Narayanan (born 14 February 1994) is an Indian chess player. He was awarded the title of Grandmaster by FIDE in August 2017.

Born in Chennai, he won the Asian Junior Chess Championship in 2012, 2013 and 2014. He is the coach of the Indian super-talent GM Nihal Sarin and he also coaches GM Arjun Erigaisi and WGM Divya Deshmukh who won Indian Senior National Championships, 2022 in men and women section respectively.

He started playing chess at five years old and in 2002, Srinath became the youngest FIDE rated player of India, at the age of eight, with an initial rating of 2088. In July 2005, he took the gold medal in the U12 division at the World Youth Chess Championships held in Belfort, France, edging out Sanan Sjugirov, Samvel Ter-Sahakyan and Wesley So on tiebreak. All four had a final score of 8½ points. He became an IM at the age of fourteen and a GM in 2017.

Srinath played for the Indian team that won the silver medal in the World Youth U16 Chess Olympiad in 2010.

He has played an important role as part of the Indian Chess Team. He was the assistant coach during the 2018 Olympiad, the captain of the Indian team in the 2019 World teams and he was the Vice Captain of the Indian team which won the historic gold medal at the FIDE Online Chess Olympiad 2020. He is also a Chess streamer and commentator, with more than 30k subscribers on YouTube and has also authored a course on the Catalan Opening for white pieces, in Chessable.

See also
 Nihal Sarin

References

External links

Srinath Narayanan at Chessable

Srinath Narayanan at Chess24

1994 births
Living people
Indian chess players
Chess grandmasters
World Youth Chess Champions